Cleveland Freeze was a professional indoor soccer team based in the Cleveland, suburb of North Olmsted, Ohio. They began play in the Professional Arena Soccer League for the 2013-14 PASL season. The Freeze hired Hector Marinaro, the all-time leader in points and goals in professional indoor soccer, as their head coach on September 24, 2013. Their mascot is the Abominable Snowman.

Year-by-year

Playoff record

Final roster

Staff

Ownership
Scott Snider, Louis Kastelic, Dave Gaddis, Chris Snider, and Chris Cole

Front office
  Scott Snider - President & General Manager
  Louis Kastelic - Director of Team Operations

Coaching staff
  Hector Marinaro - Head Coach

References

External links
Cleveland Freeze official website

 
Professional Arena Soccer League teams
Soccer clubs in Cleveland
2013 establishments in Ohio
2014 disestablishments in Ohio